110th Division or 110th Infantry Division may refer to:

 110th Infantry Division (Germany), a unit of the German Army
 110th Division (Imperial Japanese Army)
 110th Division (People's Republic of China)
 110th Rifle Division (Soviet Union), a unit of the Soviet Army

See also
 110th Regiment (disambiguation)
 110th Squadron (disambiguation)

sl:Seznam divizij po zaporednih številkah (100. - 149.)#110. divizija